The title rosh mesivta (alt. rosh metivta; ; from Jewish Babylonian Aramaic rêsh mṯivtā  ), abbreviated as Ram (is a term in Jewish education for a leading figure in an educational institution. The term has a long history, going back many centuries.

The role is comparable to a dean in a university. Just as a chancellor outranks a dean, a rosh yeshiva, when both exist, is higher.

See also
 Mesivta

References

Orthodox rabbinic roles and titles
Jewish religious occupations
Hebrew words and phrases